Agriocoris is a monotypic genus of assassin bugs (family Reduviidae), containing a single species, Agriocoris flavipes. It is widely distributed throughout Central and South America.

References 

Reduviidae
Cimicomorpha genera
Monotypic Hemiptera genera
Hemiptera of Central America